Fatbardh Jera (born 8 February 1960) is an Albanian retired footballer who played for Vllaznia Shkodër and the Albania national team.

Club career
Jera spent his entire career with Vllaznia Shkodër, after becoming part of their first team in January 1979 and playing on during the 1980s and beginning of the 1990s, forming a defensive partnership with fellow international Hysen Zmijani.

International career
He made his debut for Albania in a March 1985 friendly match against Turkey and earned a total of 15 caps, scoring no goals. His final international was a May 1990 European Championship qualification match against Iceland.

FSHF
Jera became a member of the executive committee of the Albanian Football Association in February 2014.

References

External links

1960 births
Living people
Footballers from Shkodër
Albanian footballers
Association football defenders
Albania under-21 international footballers
Albania international footballers
KF Vllaznia Shkodër players
Kategoria Superiore players